Malibu Lagoon State Beach in Malibu, California, United States, is also known as Surfrider Beach. It was dedicated as the first World Surfing Reserve on October 9, 2010.  The  site was established as a California state park in 1951. It lies within the Santa Monica Mountains National Recreation Area.

Natural history
Malibu Lagoon is an estuary at the mouth of Malibu Creek at the Pacific Ocean in Malibu. It is being restored by a multiagency partnership. Migratory birds use the lagoon when on the Pacific Flyway. Snowy Plovers nest on the beach and are protected.

Surfing

Malibu Lagoon is a famous right-break that had a big impact on the surfing culture in Southern California in the 1960s. Located near the Malibu Pier, it is among the most popular surf spots in Los Angeles County. The shoreline is usually triple-cornered due to the buildup of silt, sand, and cobble at the mouth of the creek. The tapering, smooth-breaking waves are recognized among surfers worldwide as the gold standard for summertime "point" surf.

Malibu Lagoon has three primary surfing areas. First Point has waves popular with longboarders and shortboarders during bigger swells. Second Point is used for high performance surfing. It has a main takeoff that lines up and connects into the inside called the "kiddie bowl". Third Point has a left and right side. On the south swells most common in late August and September, surfers can ride all the way to the pier.

See also
Adamson House
List of beaches in California
List of California state parks
List of California State Beaches

References

External links
Malibu Lagoon State Beach

1951 establishments in California
Beaches of Southern California
California State Beaches
Malibu, California
Parks in Los Angeles County, California
Santa Monica Mountains National Recreation Area
Surfing locations in California
Beaches of Los Angeles County, California
Tourist attractions in Malibu, California